Mario Germán Iguarán Arana (born 8 June 1960) is a Colombian lawyer and diplomat. He served as Ambassador of Colombia to Egypt between 2010 and 2012. Iguarán has also served as the 3rd Deputy Minister of Justice of Colombia, the 5th Attorney General of Colombia, and as Assistant Magistrate of the Constitutional Court of Colombia.

Career
Iguarán received his Bachelor of Law from the Externado University of Colombia in 1982, and obtained a Master in Comparative Law from the University of Bonn in Germany in 1990, and has completed specializations in Penal Cassation from La Gran Colombia University in 2003, and in High State Administration from the Colombian Higher School of Public Administration in 1998.

Ambassadorship
President Uribe offered Iguarán an ambassadorship to Switzerland following the end of his term as Attorney General, but the Swiss Government expressed their disapproval of said appointment, because Iguarán had investigated a Swiss national, Jean Pierre Gontard, for cooperation with the FARC-EP. Gontard, who was working with the permission of the Swiss and Colombian authorities as a mediator, was suspected to have gone beyond his role by aiding the FARC rebels and their associates in Europe and was called in for questioning, he however was also a close friend and associate of Swiss Federal Councillor Micheline Calmy-Rey who is also the Swiss Foreign Minister in charge of approving ambassadorial appointments to Switzerland; in the end Iguarán was dropped from consideration to this mission. 

Nonetheless, President Uribe offered him another diplomatic post, and this time the host nation permitted it; Iguarán was sworn in as Ambassador Extraordinary and Plenipotentiary of Colombia to the Republic of Egypt by Chancellor Jaime Bermúdez Merizalde on 2 March 2010 and travelling that same day to Egypt to assume his official duties, and presented his letters of credence to Egypt's President Hosni Mubarak on 27 June 2010.

He served as ambassador until early 2012.

See also
 David Sánchez Juliao

References

1960 births
Living people
People from Bogotá
Universidad Externado de Colombia alumni
Academic staff of the Free University of Colombia
University of Bonn alumni
20th-century Colombian lawyers
Attorneys General of Colombia
Ambassadors of Colombia to Egypt